Gołańcz Pomorska  (German Glansee) is a village in the administrative district of Gmina Trzebiatów, within Gryfice County, West Pomeranian Voivodeship, in north-western Poland. The village has a population of 446.

See also 

 History of Pomerania

References

Villages in Gryfice County